Nikolaus "Klaus" Barbie (25 October 1913 – 25 September 1991) was a German operative of the SS and SD who worked in Vichy France during World War II. He became known as the "Butcher of Lyon" for having personally tortured prisoners—primarily Jews and members of the French Resistance—as the head of the Gestapo in Lyon. After the war, United States intelligence services employed him for his anti-communist efforts and aided his escape to Bolivia, where he advised the dictatorial regime on how to repress opposition through torture. In 1983, the United States apologised to France for aiding Barbie's escape from an outstanding arrest warrant.

In 1972, it was discovered he was in Bolivia. While in Bolivia, the West German Intelligence Service recruited him. Barbie is suspected of having had a role in the Bolivian coup d'état orchestrated by Luis García Meza in 1980. After the fall of the dictatorship, Barbie lost the protection of the government in La Paz. In 1983, he was arrested and extradited to France, where he was convicted of crimes against humanity and sentenced to life in prison. Although he had been sentenced to death in absentia twice earlier, in 1947 and 1954, capital punishment had been abolished in France in 1981. Barbie died of cancer in prison in 1991, at age 77.

Early life and education
Nikolaus "Klaus" Barbie was born on 25 October 1913 in Godesberg, later renamed Bad Godesberg, which is today part of Bonn. The Barbie family came from Merzig, in the Saar near the French border. It is likely that his patrilineal ancestors were French Roman Catholics named Barbier who left France at the time of the French Revolution. In 1914, his father, also named Nikolaus, was conscripted to fight in the First World War. He returned an angry, bitter man. He was wounded in the neck at Verdun and captured by the French, whom he hated, and he never recovered his health. He became an alcoholic who abused his children. Until 1923, when he was 10, Klaus Barbie attended the local school where his father taught. Afterwards, he attended a boarding school in Trier, and was relieved to be away from his abusive father. In 1925, the entire Barbie family moved to Trier.

In June 1933, Barbie's younger brother Kurt died, at the age of 18, of a chronic illness. Later that year, their father died. The death of his father derailed plans for the 20-year-old Barbie to study theology, or otherwise become an academic, as his peers had expected. While unemployed, Barbie was conscripted into the Nazi labour service, the Reichsarbeitsdienst. On 26 September 1935, aged 22, he joined the SS (member 272,284), and began working in the Sicherheitsdienst (SD), the SS security service, which acted as the intelligence-gathering arm of the Nazi Party. On 1 May 1937, he became member 4,583,085 of the Nazi Party.

Second World War

After the German conquest and occupation of the Netherlands, Barbie was assigned to Amsterdam. He had been pre-assigned to Adolf Eichmann's Amt (Department) IV/B-4. This department was responsible for identification, roundup and deportation of Dutch Jews and Freemasons. On 11 October 1940, Barbie arrested , Grand Master of the Grand Orient of the Netherlands. In March 1941, van Tongeren was transported to Sachsenhausen concentration camp where, in freezing conditions, he died two weeks later. On 1 April, Barbie summoned Van Tongeren's daughter, Charlotte, to SD headquarters and informed her that her father had died of an infection in both ears and had been cremated.

In 1942, he was sent to Dijon, in the Occupied Zone of France. In November of the same year, at the age of 29, he was assigned to Lyon as the head of the local Gestapo. He established his headquarters at the Hôtel Terminus in Lyon, where he personally tortured adult and child prisoners. He became known as the "Butcher of Lyon". The daughter of a French Resistance leader based in Lyon said her father was beaten and his skin torn, and that his head was immersed in buckets of ammonia and cold water; he could not sit or stand and died three days later from burns to his skin.

Historians estimate that Barbie was directly responsible for the deaths of up to 14,000 people, personally participating in roundups such as the Rue Sainte-Catherine Roundup which saw 84 people arrested in a single day. He arrested Jean Moulin, a high-ranking member of the French Resistance and his most prominent captive. In 1943, he was awarded the Iron Cross (First Class) by Adolf Hitler for his campaign against the French Resistance and the capture of Moulin.

In April 1944, Barbie ordered the deportation to Auschwitz of a group of 44 Jewish children from an orphanage at Izieu. He then rejoined the SiPo-SD of Lyon in its retreat to Bruyères, where he led an anti-partisan attack in Rehaupal in September 1944.

US intelligence work in post-War Europe
In 1947, Barbie was recruited as an agent for the 66th Detachment of the US Army Counterintelligence Corps (CIC) along with a Serbian agent of the Belgrade special police and SD, Radislav Grujičić. The US used Barbie and other Nazi Party members to further anti-communist efforts in Europe. Specifically, they were interested in British interrogation techniques which Barbie had experienced firsthand, as well as the identities of former SS officers British intelligence agencies might be interested in recruiting. Later, the CIC housed him in a hotel in Memmingen; he reported on French intelligence activities in the French zone of occupied Germany because they suspected that the French had been infiltrated by the KGB and GPU.

The US Department of Justice report to the US Senate in 1983 opens with the summary paragraph:

As the investigation of Klaus Barbie has shown, officers of the United States government were directly responsible for protecting a person wanted by the government of France on criminal charges and in arranging his escape from the law. As a direct result of that action, Klaus Barbie did not stand trial in France in 1950; he spent 33 years as a free man and a fugitive from justice.

The French discovered that Barbie was in U.S. hands; having sentenced him to death in absentia for war crimes, they made a plea to John J. McCloy, US High Commissioner for Germany, to hand him over for execution, but McCloy allegedly refused. Instead, the CIC helped him flee to Bolivia assisted by "ratlines" organised by US intelligence services, as well as by Croatian Roman Catholic clergy, including Krunoslav Draganović. The CIC asserted that Barbie knew too much about the network of German spies the CIC had planted in various European communist organisations. It was suspicious of communist influence within the Government of France, but their protection of Barbie may have been as much to avoid the embarrassment of having recruited him in the first place. Other authors have suggested that the anticommunist element of Italian fascism and the protection of the Vatican allowed Klaus Barbie and other Nazis to flee to Bolivia.

In 1965, Barbie was recruited by the West German foreign intelligence agency Bundesnachrichtendienst (BND), under the codename  and the registration number V-43118. His initial monthly salary of 500 Deutsche Marks was transferred in May 1966 to an account of the Chartered Bank of London in San Francisco. During his time with the BND, Barbie made at least 35 reports to the BND headquarters in Pullach.

Bolivia
Barbie emigrated to Bolivia in 1951, where he lived well for 30 years in Cochabamba, under the alias Klaus Altmann. It was easier and less embarrassing for him to find employment there than in Europe; he enjoyed excellent relations with high-ranking Bolivian officials, including Bolivian dictators Hugo Banzer and Luis García Meza. "Altmann" was known for his German nationalist and anti-communist stances. While engaged in arms-trade operations in Bolivia, he was appointed to the rank of lieutenant colonel within the Bolivian Armed Forces.

Barbie collaborated with René Barrientos's regime, including teaching the general's private paramilitaries named "Furmont" how torture can best be used. The regime's political repression against leftist groups was helped by Barbie's knowledge about intelligence work, torture and interrogations. In 1972 under General Banzer (with whom Barbie collaborated even more openly), he assisted in illegal arrests, interrogations and murders of opposition and progressive groups. Journalists and activists who wrote or spoke about the regime's crimes against human rights were arrested and many fell victim to so-called "disappearances", the state's secret murders and abductions of leftists. Barbie actively participated in the regime's oppression of opponents.

Barbie was strongly linked to the neo-Nazi paramilitary member Álvaro de Castro, who was his personally hired bodyguard and the two participated in criminal actions and businesses together. De Castro had connections with powerful drug barons and the illegal drug trade and, together with Barbie (under the name Altmann) and an Austrian company, sold weapons to the drug cartels, and when de Castro was arrested he admitted in interviews that he had earlier worked for drug lords in the country. Other sources say Barbie most likely also had connections with these organizations. Initially, he worked for Roberto Suárez Gómez who eventually introduced him to Colombian traffickers. Barbie met with Pablo Escobar and several other high ranking members of the Medellín cartel in the late 1970s, and agreed to arrange for security of Escobar's raw coca supply, from its cultivation until it reached processing plants in Colombia. In exchange, Escobar agreed to fund Barbie's anti-communist activities. De Castro continued to correspond with Barbie when Barbie was later under arrest. Their connections also provided intelligence information to US authorities at the US Embassy. A group called "The Fiancés of Death", which included German Nazis and Fascists, had links to some of Barbie's actions in Bolivia. 
Barbie earlier also carried out a large arms purchase of tanks from Austria to the Bolivian army. These were then used in a coup d'état.

According to various reports, after the emergence of Ernesto Che Guevara in Bolivia in 1966, Barbie's anti-partisan skills were in demand again, and he worked for the Bolivian Interior Ministry with the rank of Lieutenant as an instructor and adviser to the security forces. During an interview, Alvaro de Castro claimed that Barbie constantly "boasted of hunting down Che".

People who met Barbie during his time in Bolivia have said that he was a firm and fanatical believer in the Nazi ideology and an anti-Semite. Barbie and de Castro reportedly talked about the cases and searches for Josef Mengele and Adolf Eichmann, whom Barbie supported and wanted to assist in remaining on the run.

Manhunt

Barbie was identified as being in Peru in 1971 by Serge and Beate Klarsfeld (Nazi hunters from France) who came across a secret document that revealed his alias. On 19 January 1972, this information was published in the French newspaper L'Aurore, along with a photograph of Altmann which the Klarsfelds obtained from a German expatriate living in Lima, Peru. In Peru, Barbie provided security services to the junta of General Juan Velasco Alvarado following the military coup of 3 October 1968, including surveillance of the U.S. diplomatic mission led by John Irwin in March 1969.

Led by Beate Klarsfeld, French journalist Ladislas de Hoyos and cameraman Christian van Ryswyck flew to La Paz in January 1972 in order to find and interview Barbie posing as his alias Klaus Altmann. The interview took place on 3 February 1972 in the Department of the Interior building and the following day, in prison where Barbie was placed under protection by the Bolivian authorities. In the videotape, and while the interview was conducted in Spanish, Ladislas de Hoyos steers away from the previously agreed upon questions by asking whether Barbie has ever been to Lyon in French, a language he is not supposed to understand under his fake identity, to which Klaus Barbie automatically responds by the negative in German. Ladislas de Hoyos gave him photos of members of Resistance he had tortured, asking him if he recognized their faces, and while he returned them in denial, his fingerprints unmistakenly betrayed him. It was in this interview, later broadcast on French TV Channel Antenne 2 that he was recognized by French resistance member Simone Lagrange who had been tortured by Klaus Barbie in 1944.

Despite global outcry, Barbie was able to return to Bolivia where the government refused to extradite him, stating that France and Bolivia did not have an extradition treaty and that the statute of limitations on his crimes had expired. Barbie's close fascist friends knew who he was, but to the public Barbie insisted he was none other than his innocent alter-ego "Altmann" and in the videotaped interview conducted by Ladislas de Hoyos which he allowed, he continued to lie about never having been in Lyon, never knowing Jean Moulin or having been in the Gestapo. However, in the 1970s, the community of refugee Jews who had survived or escaped the war, openly discussed the fact that Barbie was the war criminal from Lyon now living on the Calle Landaeta in La Paz and frequenting the Café de La Paz daily.

Journalist and reporter Peter McFarren and a journalist for The New York Times said that while they were outside Barbie's house in Bolivia in 1981, wanting to speak to him for an article, they saw Barbie in a window while they were taking photos and shortly thereafter they were taken away by twelve armed paramilitary men who had quickly arrived in a van and asked what they were doing there.

The testimony of Italian insurgent Stefano Delle Chiaie before the Italian Parliamentary Commission on Terrorism suggests that Barbie took part in the "cocaine coup" of Luis García Meza, when the regime forced its way to power in Bolivia in 1980.

Extradition, trial and death
In 1983, the newly elected democratic government of Hernán Siles Zuazo arrested Barbie in La Paz on the pretext of his owing the government US$10,000 for goods he was supposed to have delivered but did not. A few days later, the government delivered him to France to stand trial.

Shortly after Barbie's extradition, evidence emerged that Barbie had worked for US intelligence in Germany and that US agents may have been instrumental in Barbie's flight to Bolivia to escape prosecution in France. Allan Ryan, Director of the Office of Special Investigations (OSI) of the US Justice Department, recommended to US Attorney General William French Smith that the matter be investigated. Following a lengthy investigation and a full report that was released to the public, Ryan concluded that "officers of the United States government were directly responsible for protecting a person wanted by the government of France on criminal charges and in arranging his escape from the law." Ryan felt that the initial decision for the US government to use Barbie during Cold War counter-intelligence work, while reprehensible in light of his war-crimes, might be defended on national security interest grounds. Doing so was no different from what other World War II victor nations were doing at the time; it appeared to have been done without any US Counter Intelligence Corps (CIC) knowledge of Barbie's atrocities in Lyon. After those atrocities became well publicised, however, Ryan regarded it as indefensible for CIC personnel to lie to higher US authorities and help Barbie escape Europe to Bolivia rather than honour an outstanding French warrant for his arrest. As a result of Ryan's report and personal recommendation, the US government made a formal apology to France for enabling Barbie to escape French justice for 33 years.

In 1984, Barbie was indicted for crimes committed as Gestapo chief in Lyon between 1942 and 1944, chief among which was the Rue Sainte-Catherine Roundup. The jury trial started on 11 May 1987 in Lyon before the Rhône Cour d'Assises. Unusually, the court allowed the trial to be filmed because of its historical value. A special courtroom was constructed with seating for an audience of about 700. The head prosecutor was Pierre Truche. Barbie's role in Hitler's Final Solution was the issue.

Barbie's defence was funded by Swiss pro-Nazi financier François Genoud and led by attorney Jacques Vergès. Barbie was tried on 41 separate counts of crimes against humanity, based on the depositions of 730 Jews and French Resistance survivors who described how he tortured and murdered prisoners. The father of French Minister for Justice Robert Badinter had died in Sobibor after being deported from Lyon during Barbie's tenure.

Barbie gave his name as Klaus Altmann, the name that he used while in Bolivia. He claimed that his extradition was technically illegal and asked to be excused from the trial and returned to his cell at Prison Saint-Paul. This was granted. He was brought back to court on 26 May 1987 to face some of his accusers, about whose testimony he had "nothing to say".

Barbie's defence lawyer, Jacques Vergès, had a reputation for attacking the French political system, particularly in the historic French colonial empire. His strategy was to use the trial to talk about war crimes committed by France since 1945. He got the prosecution to drop some of the charges against Barbie due to French legislation that had protected French citizens accused of the same crimes under the Vichy regime and in French Algeria. Vergès tried to argue that Barbie's actions were no worse than the supposedly ordinary actions of colonialists worldwide, and that his trial was tantamount to selective prosecution. During his trial, Barbie said, "When I stand before the throne of God, I shall be judged innocent."

The court rejected the defence's argument. On 4 July 1987, Barbie was convicted and sentenced to life imprisonment. He died in prison in Lyon four years later of leukemia and spine and prostate cancer at the age of 77.

Personal life
In April 1939, Barbie became engaged to Regina Margaretta Willms, the 23-year-old daughter of a postal clerk; they had two children, a son named Klaus-Georg Altmann and a daughter named Ute Messner.

In 1983, Françoise Croizier, Klaus Barbie's French daughter-in-law, said in an interview that the CIA kidnapped Klaus-Georg in 1946 to make sure his father carried out intelligence missions for the agency. Croizier met Klaus-Georg while both were students in Paris; they married in 1968, had three children and lived in Europe and Bolivia using the surname Altmann. Croizier said when she married she did not know who her father-in-law was, but that she could guess the reasons for a German to settle in South America after the war. Klaus-Georg died in a hang-gliding accident in 1981.

In media 
 The 1988 American documentary film Hotel Terminus: The Life and Times of Klaus Barbie, directed by the German-French director Marcel Ophuls, details Barbie's life between childhood and the trial near the end of his life. The film received the Academy Award for Best Documentary.

 The British–French documentary film My Enemy's Enemy (Mon Meilleur Ennemi in French) is the story of Klaus Barbie, following him through World War II and post-war hiding journey in Bolivia. It depicts his involvement in the assassination of Che Guevara. It also discusses his French trial for war crimes committed in Lyon, such as the torture of Jean Moulin.

 In the 2001 film Rat Race, the Pear family visits a museum dedicated to Klaus Barbie, located in the southwest United States, after mistakenly thinking it was a museum dedicated to the famous doll.

 Barbie is played by Marc Rissmann in the 2019 movie A Call to Spy.

 Barbie is portrayed by Matthias Schweighöfer in the 2020 film Resistance, which is a free adaptation of the experiences of the French mime Marcel Marceau during World War II, when he helped to save Jewish children from deportation to Nazi Germany as a member of the Jewish resistance. Barbie is the main antagonist as the group operates within Lyon.

See also

 Operation Condor
 Operation Bloodstone
 Glossary of Nazi Germany
 List of Nazi Party leaders and officials
 Alice Vansteenberghe

References

Further reading 
 
  A chapter in this book also follows how top Nazis made their way to Argentina and elsewhere in Latin America.
 Hammerschmidt, Peter: "Die Tatsache allein, daß V-43 118 SS-Hauptsturmführer war, schließt nicht aus, ihn als Quelle zu verwenden". Der Bundesnachrichtendienst und sein Agent Klaus Barbie, in: Zeitschrift für Geschichtswissenschaft (ZfG), 59. Jahrgang, 4/2011. METROPOL Verlag. Berlin 2011, S. 333–349.
  Case No. 77, Fn 908 KsD Lyon IV-B (gez. Ostubaf. Barbie) an BdS, Paris IV-B, 6 April 1944, RF-1235.

External links

 French Judicial Archives on Klaus Barbie 
 Klaus Barbie at the German National Library 
 
 Marcel Ophüls's 
 Kevin Macdonald's 
  (English: "Terror's Advocate")

1913 births
1991 deaths
SS-Hauptsturmführer
Antisemitism in Germany
German people convicted of crimes against humanity
German prisoners sentenced to life imprisonment
Prisoners sentenced to life imprisonment by France
Prisoners who died in French detention
German people imprisoned abroad
People convicted of murder by France
War crimes in France
German fascists
German Roman Catholics
Holocaust perpetrators in France
Nazis in South America
Gestapo personnel
Federal Intelligence Service informants
People of the Central Intelligence Agency
German emigrants to Bolivia
Bolivian military personnel
Bolivian anti-communists
Anti-Masonry
People extradited to France
Military personnel from Bonn
People from the Rhine Province
People extradited from Bolivia
German police officers convicted of murder
Police misconduct in France
German anti-communists
Deaths from leukemia
Deaths from prostate cancer
Deaths from spinal cancer
Deaths from cancer in France
Neurological disease deaths in France
Reich Labour Service members
Nazis sentenced to death in absentia
Nazis who died in prison custody